Diamant de Yaoundé is a Cameroonian football club based in Yaoundé.

In 1966 the team has won the Cameroon Première Division.

Achievements
 Cameroon Première Division
Champion (1): 1966

Cameroon Cup
Winner (3):1964, 1971, 1972

References

External links 
Team profile - leballonrond.fr

Football clubs in Cameroon
Sports clubs in Cameroon